Prince Masanari (雅成親王, Masanari shinnō; 1200–1255) was a waka poet and Japanese nobleman active in the early Kamakura period. He was a son of Emperor Go-Toba.

External links 
E-text of his poems in Japanese

1200 births
1255 deaths
13th-century Japanese poets
Sons of emperors